Stanley Johnson may refer to:

 Stanley Johnson (basketball) (born 1996), American basketball player
 Stanley Johnson (writer) (born 1940), British author and Conservative Party politician, father of former British prime minister Boris Johnson
 Stanley Johnson (London politician) (1869–1937), English solicitor and Conservative Party politician, MP 1918–1924
 Stanley A. Johnson (1925–2013), American politician, farmer, and Methodist minister
 Stan Johnson (1937–2012), baseball outfielder
Stan Johnson (basketball coach), American basketball coach

See also
Stanley Johnston (1900 –1962), Australian-American journalist